J. Clinton Brogdon House is a historic house located at 3755 Boots Branch Road near Sumter, Sumter County, South Carolina.

Description and history 
It was built in 1911, and is a two-story, three bay, frame Neo-Classical style dwelling. It features a full façade front porch supported by six unfluted columns with Ionic order capitals. It may be a rare example of a mail order house in the area.

It was added to the National Register of Historic Places on July 1, 1993.

References

Houses on the National Register of Historic Places in South Carolina
Neoclassical architecture in South Carolina
Houses completed in 1911
Houses in Sumter County, South Carolina
National Register of Historic Places in Sumter County, South Carolina